Beda Higgins   is a poet and writer living in Newcastle upon Tyne.

Biography 
Beda Higgins is an Anglo-Irish writer from Lancashire who lives in Newcastle upon Tyne, where she works as a Psychiatric and General Nurse. She completed a masters in creative writing from Northumbria University in 2000. In her career as a nurse she has been awarded the Queen's Nursing Institute Awards for her work using creative writing with patients. She is also a poet and short story writer who has won the Northern Writers' Awards on multiple occasions as well as the Geoff Stevens Memorial Prize. Her work is published in anthologies as well as two collections of short stories. In 2021 her work was shortlisted for the Pigott Poetry Prize.

Publications 
As Sole Author

 
 
  Collection of short stories.

Anthologies and collections: Prose and poetry 
 2021 THE CULTURAL AFTERLIFE OF RUINS National Museums NI
 2020 THESE ARE THE HANDS Fair Acre Press 
 2018 THE HIPPOCRATES PRIZE 
 2018 POEMS FOR THE NHS The Onslaught press 
 2018 POEMS FOR GRENFELL The Onslaught press 
 2016 COLD IRON Ghost stories Iron Press 
 2013 ROOT Iron Press 
 2010 BOOK OF TEN. Zebra publishing 
 2009 THE GRIST ANTHOLOGY OF NEW WRITING. 
 2006 ON NEW STREET. Biscuit Publishing 
 2005 THE POETRY CURE. Bloodaxe Books 
 2005 FOR THE KIDS. Biscuit Publishing 
 2002 ADRIFT FROM BELIZE TO HAVANA. Biscuit Publishing 
 2001 BISCUIT POETRY ANTHOLOGY. 

Articles in Journals and Magazines
 2022 Arts Ireland: A nurse bears witness http://www.artsandhealth.ie/perspectives/ourselves-a-nurse-poet-bears-witness/
 2021 Intima Journal of narrative medicine A LIFE
 2017 Mslexia Magazine  
 2009 Mslexia Magazine first prize winner story  
 2003 Mslexia Magazine  
 2001 Mslexia Magazine 
Multiple articles and opinion pieces published in Independent Nurse.

Awards 
2019 VS Pritchett short story prize longlist

2018 Hippocrates Poetry Award commendation

2016 Northern Writer New Fiction Bursary

2015 Edgehill Prize longlist

2015 Frank O’Connor Prize longlist

2012 Luke Bitmead Novel Award shortlist

2012 Edgehill Prize longlist

2011 Read Regional Recommendation

2010 Northern Writer Award

2010 Cinnamon Press novel Award shortlist

2009 winner Mslexia short story competition

2007 Residential Prize winner Biscuit Publishing

2004 Northern Promise Award

2004 Novel shortlisted Lit Idol national competition

Projects 
2022 Speaker at Sunderland Symposium: Humanities in Medicine

2016–2020 BBC 2 500 words children’s competition Judge

2013 Writing mentor for New Writing North Cuckoo project

2010 Art’s council representative Toronto short story conference

2010 National Short Story Day commissioned story ‘Cinderella’ broadcast

2008 Queens Nursing Institute Award Creative Writing as a therapeutic tool

2007 Writing mentor regeneration project/New Writing North 2007

2006 Writing mentor Creative centre/New Writing North 2006

Regular contributor to Independent Nurse (Journal for Professional Nurses)

Sources 

Living people
Year of birth missing (living people)
Writers from Newcastle upon Tyne
Anglo-Irish women poets
English nurses
21st-century Irish women writers